Several ships have borne the name SS Tuscania, all in the Cunard-subsidiary Anchor Line. These include:

 , a 14,348-ton liner torpedoed in 1918 while transporting US soldiers to Europe.

Ship names